The Datsun DA was a small automobile produced by Nissan and sold under the Datsun brand as Nissan's first post-war passenger car. The DA was introduced in November 1947, a direct result of the occupying Allied command once again allowing production of passenger cars. As the tooling for the pre-war Datsun Type 17 was no longer available, the DA was based on the Datsun 1121 truck (which itself was based on the pre-war 17T truck); it used the 722 cc Type 7 side valve engine from the 17T as well as its floor-shifted 3-speed manual transmission and front clip, including a pressed steel grille and nearly no brightwork. 

Datsun also offered the Deluxe Sedan (DB) with more modern ponton bodywork alongside the lower cost DA Standard Sedan. The DA had a simple pressed metal grille when first introduced; by 1949 this had been replaced by a more ornate chromed unit. The DA also received a redesigned, less boxy rear section in 1948. The DA was in production until 1950 when it was replaced by the Datsun DS Series (later also marketed as the "Thrift").

References
 

Datsun vehicles
Cars introduced in 1947
1950s cars